This is a list of broadcast television stations serving cities in the Canadian province of Alberta.

See also
List of television stations in Canada
Media in Canada

References

Global OTA Channel List
Alberta

Television stations